Holtmann is a surname. Notable people with the surname include:

Alexander Holtmann (born 1978), Finnish-German actor
Chris Holtmann (born 1971), American basketball coach
Felix Holtmann (born 1944), Canadian politician
Gerrit Holtmann (born 1995), German footballer
Mina Fürst Holtmann (born 1995); Norwegian alpine skier

See also
Holtzmann